Big Sugar Creek State Park is a public recreation area encompassing more than  in McDonald County in southwest Missouri, United States. The state park was established in 1992 to preserve part of the Elk River water system, which Big Sugar Creek is part of. The park has a three-mile-long (5 km) trail for hiking. A major portion of the park has been designated as the Elk River Breaks Natural Area.

References

External links
Big Sugar Creek State Park Missouri Department of Natural Resources
Big Sugar Creek State Park Map Missouri Department of Natural Resources

State parks of Missouri
Protected areas of McDonald County, Missouri
State parks of the U.S. Interior Highlands
Protected areas established in 1992